Jakovce is a small village next to Tabor in the Municipality of Sežana in the Littoral region of Slovenia.

References

External links

Jakovce on Geopedia

Populated places in the Municipality of Sežana